Grand Theft Auto 2 is an action-adventure game, developed by DMA Design and published by Rockstar Games in October 1999, for Microsoft Windows and the PlayStation, and the Dreamcast and Game Boy Color in 2000. It is the sequel to 1997's Grand Theft Auto, and the second main instalment of the Grand Theft Auto series. Set within a retrofuturistic metropolis known as "Anywhere City", the game focuses on players taking the role of a criminal as they roam an open world, conducting jobs for various crime syndicates and having free rein to do whatever they wish to achieve their goal. The game's intro is unique for a title in the series, as it involved live-action scenes filmed by Rockstar Games.

Grand Theft Auto 2 received mixed reviews for most platforms, and negative reviews for the Game Boy Color, but was a moderate commercial success. While the soundtrack and some gameplay elements, such as the gang loyalty system, were praised, the graphics, controls, and setting received a more mixed game response. The game was also criticized for failing to innovate the formula established by its predecessor, despite several improvements it brought. Grand Theft Auto 2 was followed by 2001's Grand Theft Auto III, which started a new era for the series, while the game itself was re-released on Steam in January 2008.

Gameplay 

Like its predecessor Grand Theft Auto, the game focuses on players completing a series of levels, each requiring a set target score being achieved in order to progress to the next stage. Points are awarded from various criminal actions such as destroying cars, selling vehicles, and completing missions for various crime syndicates, with the latter awarding more points than doing simple criminal actions. Creating chaos from their crimes will cause the player to be wanted by the police who will hound the player to arrest or kill them, with higher wanted levels increasing the level of response used. Being arrested or dying loses the player any equipment they found, and impacts their multiplier bonus.

Grand Theft Auto 2's setting is unique for the series: a retrofuturistic metropolis referred to only as "Anywhere, USA", which is divided into three districts (Downtown, Residential, and Industrial) that players will switch between as they progress through the game. The time period the game is set in is not specified—conflicting sources suggest anything from "three weeks into the future", to the year being 2013, despite in-game references to the "new millenium" that is coming (implying the game takes place around its time of release, in 1999).

The game introduced several new features and improvements to the series. Players can now save their game during a playthrough of a level by visiting the church they start at, but must pay a set number of points to do so. Jobs on offer come from three different syndicates—each level features two unique syndicates, alongside a third syndicate present in all levels. By doing jobs for a syndicate and successfully completing them, the player gains respect with that syndicate, allowing them to take on tougher jobs with enough respect, but lose it with their chief rivals, locking them out of their jobs and making the syndicate's members hostile to the player. Other improvements include vehicles and pedestrians being more interactive with the game's environment—such as gang members engaging in fights with police—the presence of other criminals (such as muggers), a health meter, garages that can modify vehicles with special improvements, a selection of side missions ranging from running a taxi to driving a semi-truck, and groups of 'hidden' packages to find across the level.

GTA 2 – The Movie 
The game was developed with an eight-minute short film of live-action footage, filmed within New York City. The movie was devised as an introductory sequence for the game, and was made available on Rockstar Games's website. The film follows a criminal named Claude Speed (played by Scott Maslen), who conducts jobs around Anywhere City for several criminal syndicates, until his actions eventually catch up and he is killed by an assassin from one of the gangs he robbed. The film was based on a screenplay by Dan Houser, and directed by Alex De Rakoff.

Soundtrack 

Each area features five radio stations from a pool of eleven, one of which is heard as the player drives most vehicles in-game. Changing radio stations for preference is possible. "Head Radio" was present in the original Grand Theft Auto, Grand Theft Auto III and Grand Theft Auto: Liberty City Stories. Each gang has its own radio station that transmits within a limited area. Police vehicles, ambulances, fire trucks and tanks had no ability to listen to the radio channels. Instead, the player would hear the radio transmitter of the emergency services.

All the music and the ads included in the game are exclusive, following the tradition of previous games. People in charge of the musical content were Craig Conner, Stuart Ross, Paul Scargill, Colin Anderson, Bert Reid and Moving Shadow. Some of these producers would keep their work on subsequent GTA releases.

The Game Boy Color version uses some real songs, one of which is a sped up version of "Back in Black" by AC/DC. The Character Selection theme is an old Brazilian song titled "Chega de Saudade".

Reception 

Grand Theft Auto 2s computer version received a "Silver" sales award from the Entertainment and Leisure Software Publishers Association (ELSPA), indicating sales of at least 100,000 copies in the United Kingdom. The game's PlayStation version received a "Platinum" sales award (300,000 or more units in the United Kingdom) from ELSPA.

Grand Theft Auto 2 was released to mixed reviews. The game's graphics received mixed reactions from critics, who noted that they had barely any difference to the graphics in the original game. IGN's Tal Blevins called them "average at best", and that the scenery is "hard to appreciate". Jeff Gerstmann of GameSpot said that the "graphics look a bit plain." The game's soundtrack received positive feedback, with Jeff Gerstmann calling it a "great soundtrack", and that it "closely [mirrors] the station-style of the original game". Tal Blevins of IGN called it "one of the best features" of the game.

Grand Theft Auto 2s gameplay elements received mixed reactions. IGN's Jeremy Dunham said that the gameplay is "where the game really takes a punch to the stomach", and that it "could've been a lot better." Tal Blevins called it "simple, but effective." Jeff Gerstmann said that "even though the gameplay is largely the same as in the previous GTA, it's still a lot of fun." Edge highlighted the game's story development and inventive missions, stating that Grand Theft Auto 2 "manages to draw you deep into the complexities of its world".

Blake Fischer reviewed the Dreamcast version of the game for Next Generation, rating it two stars out of five, and stated that it is "A great idea that, for one reason or another, never really gets into a must-play game."

Notes

References

Bibliography

External links 
 
 

1999 video games
Action-adventure games
Cyberpunk video games
Dreamcast games
Freeware games
Game Boy Color games
2
Open-world video games
Organized crime video games
PlayStation (console) games
Rockstar Games games
Top-down video games
Video games developed in the United Kingdom
Video game sequels
Windows games
Video games set in 2013
Video games set in the United States
Multiplayer and single-player video games
Retrofuturistic video games
Cancelled Nintendo 64 games
Video games written by Dan Houser
Works about the Yakuza